is a railway station in Aoba-ku, Sendai in Miyagi Prefecture, Japan, operated by East Japan Railway Company (JR East).

Lines

Station layout

The station is an elevated station with a single side platform where all trains stop. The station building is located to the east end of the platform and features a Midori no Madoguchi staffed ticket office,  ticket machines, and an accessible restroom.  Stairs and an elevator to street level are located directly to the south of the station, and a car park is located to the east.

Platforms

History
Tōhokufukushidaimae Station opened on 18 March 2007. Kazuhiro Sasaki (retired baseball pitcher and alumnus of nearby Tohoku Fukushi University) served as the ceremonial station master for the opening day.

Passenger statistics
In fiscal 2018, the station was used by an average of 3,645 passengers daily (boarding passengers only).

Surrounding area
 Tohoku Fukushi University

See also
 List of railway stations in Japan

References

External links

 

Stations of East Japan Railway Company
Railway stations in Sendai
Senzan Line
Railway stations in Japan opened in 2007